is a tactical role-playing game developed by Kaga Tech and published by Namco and released in Japan for the Game Boy Advance on March 7, 2003. As part of the Tales series, it retains several familiar features while adding new ones.

The game acts as a follow-up to the events of Tales of Phantasia, with the main character, Fulein Lester, actually being a descendant of the character Claus Lester from the aforementioned title. It is the second sequel to Tales of Phantasia, after Tales of Phantasia: Narikiri Dungeon.

Story 
Summoner's Lineage takes place in the same world as Tales of Phantasia, in the year 4765 by the Aselia Calendar (411 years after ToP's future). As a young summoning apprentice, Fulein K. Lester and his sprite-like companion Macaron are studying the principles of calling upon magical beasts into the physical world. However, their exploits are cut short when a significant number of monsters and other beasts begin to appear within their world, threatening the stability of their long-peaceful nation. It is decided that in order to combat these creatures, the legendary Heroes of Time (the name given to the main characters of Tales of Phantasia after their adventures across several centuries in the previous title) would have to be called upon. It is then that Cress, Claus, Mint, Suzu, Arche, and Chester make their appearance, and with their combined skills, along with the help of some new faces, they will hopefully rid the world of this new crisis.

Gameplay 

Though structurally quite different from the usual Tales games, Summoner's Lineage features items and enemies that were seen in other titles. In this game, characters are moved across a grid-like board, only going into combat once they have moved themselves close enough to an enemy.  It is then that they will enter combat and be able to issue various commands such as physical attacks and magic spells in order to defeat their opponent. Each character and enemy is given an elemental alignment that determines which attacks will be best suited to defeating them (a "fire" character would take more damage from a water-based attack, for instance).

These differences in structure can be attributed to the fact that Summoner's Lineage is actually a gameplay sequel to a Japanese Namco Game Boy Color game called Pocket King, a sequel to the 1988 Famicom title King of Kings (featured in Namco Anthology 2).

In addition to the principal characters of Tales of Phantasia, the player can also utilize Fulein's ability to summon several different kinds of creatures to aid in battle.  These monsters, like any other character, have their own unique statistics and attacks, as well as their own ways of approaching combat.

References

2003 video games
Game Boy Advance games
Game Boy Advance-only games
Japan-exclusive video games
Tactical role-playing video games
World: Summoner's Lineage, Tales of the
Video game sequels
Video games developed in Japan
Kōsuke Fujishima